Roxburgh railway station was on the Kelso Line, and served the village of Roxburgh, Scottish Borders, from 1850 to 1964.

History 
The station was opened on 17 June 1850 by the North British Railway. It closed to both passengers and goods traffic on 15 June 1964.

References

External links 

Disused railway stations in the Scottish Borders
Former North British Railway stations
Railway stations in Great Britain opened in 1850
Railway stations in Great Britain closed in 1964
1850 establishments in Scotland
1964 disestablishments in Scotland